Brigadier Christopher Allan Hector Perera Jayawardena  (1898-1986) was a Ceylonese forest conservator, military officer and socialite. He was a Senior Assistant Conservator of Forests, Equerry to Queen Elizabeth II, Aide-de-camp to the Governor-General and Chief Commissioner of the Sri Lanka Scout Association

Public service
Educated at Trinity College, Kandy, he joined the joined the Forest Department as an Assistant Conservator of Forests. Attending Impriral Forestry Institute at the University of Oxford, he gained a gained a Diploma in Forestry. He became the Senior Assistant Conservator of Forests before his retirement in 1949. He was a Justice of the peace for the western province. He served as the District Commissioner of the Colombo District Scout Association and was later the Chief Commissioner of the Sri Lanka Scout Association and Commissioner of the St. John Ambulance. He was also a senior freemason in Irish, English, and the Scottish masonic lodge in Sri Lanka.

Military service
Jayawardena was commissioned as a second lieutenant in the Ceylon Light Infantry, as a volunteer officer in the Ceylon Defense Force in 1925. With the on set of World War II, the Ceylon Light Infantry was expanded for war time service and Major Jayawardena was appointed commanding officer of the 1st Battalion with Captain Anton Muttukumaru serving as his adjutant.  He was soon promoted to rank of lieutenant colonel. With the formation of the Ceylon Army in 1949, he transferred to the Ceylon Volunteer Force Reserve with the rank of colonel and was appointed extra aide-de-camp to the governor-general in 1950, holding the appointment till 1959. In 1954, he served as equerry to Her Majesty Queen Elizabeth II during her Royal visit to Ceylon. He served as the commanding officer of the Home Guard Regiment when it was formed in 1955. On his retirement from the army in 1959, he was promoted to the honorary rank of Brigadier, the first volunteer officer to be promoted to the rank. He remained an honorary extra aide-de-camp to the governor-general till the late 1960s.

Honors
He was appointed a Member of the Order of the British Empire (Military division) (MBE), an Officer of the Order of the British Empire (Military division) (OBE) in the 1944 New Year Honours, an Commander of the Order of St John (CStJ), a Commander of the Royal Victorian Order (CVO) in 1954 by the Queen during her visit to Ceylon and Companion of the Order of St Michael and St George (CMG) in the 1956 New Year Honours for public service.

His medals include the Efficiency Decoration, Defence Medal (1946), the War Medal 1939–1945 (1946) for wartime service in World War II with the Ceylon Defense Force; and for service in the Ceylon Army, he received the Ceylon Armed Services Long Service Medal, the Queen Elizabeth II Coronation Medal and the Ceylon Armed Services Inauguration Medal.

Family
He married Sylvia Dorothy Samarasinghe. His sister Esther Jayawardena married Oliver Ernest Goonetilleke, who later became the third Governor-General of Ceylon. She died before her husband joined public service. Jayawardena had two children, Sita Helen Evelyn Parakrama (1925 - 1978) and Christopher Jayawardena. Both children predeceased him.

References

External links
 Lieutenant Colonel Jayawardene of Ceylon, who has been awarded the MBE (Military) in 1944. Imperial War Museums

Sinhalese civil servants
Ceylonese military personnel
British Army personnel of World War II
People from British Ceylon
Ceylonese military personnel of World War II
Ceylon Light Infantry officers
Sri Lanka Army Volunteer Force officers
Equerries
Ceylonese Members of the Royal Victorian Order
Ceylonese Companions of the Order of St Michael and St George
Ceylonese Officers of the Order of the British Empire
Commanders of the Order of St John
Sri Lankan brigadiers
Ceylonese lieutenant colonels
Alumni of Trinity College, Kandy
Alumni of the University of Oxford
Sri Lankan justices of the peace